Palle Virtanen (19 September 1910 – 30 September 2000) was a Finnish sprinter. He competed in the men's 100 metres at the 1936 Summer Olympics.

References

External links
 

1910 births
2000 deaths
Athletes (track and field) at the 1936 Summer Olympics
Finnish male sprinters
Olympic athletes of Finland
Place of birth missing